The 2022 F4 Brazilian Championship was the inaugural season of the F4 Brazilian Championship. It was a multi-event motor racing championship for open wheel, formula racing cars regulated according to FIA Formula 4 regulations. The championship used Tatuus F4 T-421 chassis.

Teams and drivers 

All pre-selected teams were Brazilian-registered and each fields 4 cars. Team allocation for the drivers was decided by a draw.

Race calendar 
All rounds were held in Brazil and all but one supported the 2022 Stock Car Pro Series events. The schedule was revealed on 21 December 2021. The revised version was published on 5 May 2022. Further changes were announced on 30 June 2022. The postponement of the last two rounds, that included moving the round five to support the Copa Truck and the season finale from Autódromo Internacional Nelson Piquet (Brasília) to Autódromo José Carlos Pace, was announced on 5 October 2022.

Championship standings 
Points were awarded to the top ten classified finishers in 25-minute races and for the top eight classified finishers in 18-minute races. The final classification was obtained by dropping two worst results from the first five rounds of the championship.

Drivers' standings

Teams' championship 
Each team acquired the points earned by their two best drivers in each race.

Notes

References

External links
 

Brazilian F4
Brazilian F4
F4